The following is a list of Sites of Special Scientific Interest in the Mull, Coll and Tiree Area of Search. For other areas, see List of SSSIs by Area of Search.

 Allt Molach
 Ardalanish Bay
 Ardmeanach
 Ardtun Leaf Beds
 Ardura - Auchnacraig
 Ben More - Scarisdale
 Calgary Dunes
 Ceann a'Mhara to Loch a'Phuill
 Coladoir Bog
 Crossapol and Gunna
 Cruach Choireadail
 Glas Eileanan
 Gribun Shore and Crags
 Hough Bay and Balevullin Machair
 Lagganulva Wood
 Loch Ba Woodland
 Loch Sguabain
 North East Coll Lochs and Moors
 S'Airde Beinn
 Sleibhtean agus Cladach Thiriodh
 Sound of Mull Cliffs
 South Mull Coast
 Staffa
 Totamore Dunes and Loch Ballyhaugh
 Treshnish Isles

Coll
Mull, Coll and Tiree
Isle of Mull
 
Tiree